Brooksfield is a Volvo Ocean 60 yacht. She finished sixth in the W60 class of the 1993–94 Whitbread Round the World Race skippered by Guido Maisto.

Since 2000, the owner was Mobitel (Slovenian Telekom), who renamed it Veliki viharnik, but currently it is owned by Slovenian businessman Dejan Kovačič.

In 2019 it was bought by Slovene skipper Jure Orel's firm Clean Sport and renamed Clean Sport Too.

Design

Career
2nd Jadranska regata/Adriatic race (2008) 
Skipper Dušan Puh		
Position	1
Group	MAXI
Finish time	2.5.2008. 20:59:40
Sailed time	32:59:40

4th Jadranska regata/Adriatic race (2010) 
Skipper Dušan Puh		
Position	1
Group	MAXI
Finish time	1.5.2010. 01:00:41
Sailed time	38:00:41

5th Jadranska regata/Adriatic race (2011) 
Skipper Dušan Puh		
Position	3
Group	MAXI 
Finish time	30.4.2011. 06:40:54
Sailed time	43:40:54

Current status
After two years long-term storage at the Marina of Portorož, the yacht was moved to the Marina of Koper; the current main sponsor is the town of Koper.
Brooksfield won the Diplomatic Regatta 2015 and Skipper Cup 2015, and was 2nd at the Jabuka Regatta 2015 and 3rd at Bernetti 2015.

Brooksfield on YouTube 
 Brooksfield (Veliki viharnik) on Fiumanka regatta 2004
 Brooksfield (Veliki viharnik) on Adriatic race 2011

References

Volvo Ocean Race yachts
Sailing yachts of Italy
Sailing yachts of Slovenia
Volvo Ocean 60 yachts
1990s sailing yachts